The Indo-Pacific tarpon (Megalops cyprinoides), also known as the oxeye herring or simply herring due to its superficial resemblance to the true herrings, of which it is not a member, is the smaller of the two species of tarpon and lives in Indo-Pacific waters.

Description
In appearance, it is like the much larger Atlantic tarpon, M. atlanticus - olive-green on top, and silver on the sides. The large mouth is turned upwards; the lower jaw contains an elongated, bony plate. The last ray of the dorsal fin is much longer than the others, reaching nearly to the tail. It is capable of filling its swim bladder with air and absorbing oxygen from it. They live upwards of 44 years and mature within two. They complete their metamorphosis from their larval stage in 10 days.

Diet and behavior
They are opportunistic, feeding on smaller fish, crustaceans, and even plants rarely. In salt water, they mainly feed on prawns and herring, but also many other small fish. In fresh water, no significant difference in their food habits is seen; they eat freshwater prawns and bony bream, mainly.

The Indo-Pacific tarpon migrates between the open sea and inland rivers. As with all Elopiformes, it spawns mainly offshore. Juveniles of the species stay inshore and migrate to coastal areas while maturing to spawn. Typically, they spawn twice a year. At sea, the larvae migrate inland and are leptocephalic (flattened, transparent and eel-like). Unlike the barramundi, they are able to breed in fresh and salt water.

They inhabit coral reefs, mangroves, swamps, rivers, lakes, reservoirs, floodplains, and canals. In Papua New Guinea, they are reportedly found under large mats of Salvinia molesta.

Distribution

The Indo-Pacific tarpon is found from the coasts of East Africa and the Arabian Peninsula to the coastal waters of South Asia, Southeast Asia, southern Japan, French Polynesia, and southern Australia. Their usual habitat is in coastal waters, estuaries and many miles upstream (from the estuaries) in freshwater rivers and lakes. They are amphidromus, i.e. they migrate from the river to the sea, and from the sea to the river. The tarpon lives in many tropical areas of Australia in the tropical, coastal, and brackish waters of the Indo-Pacific Ocean in both fresh and salt water. They are widely distributed from Australia, Japan, South and Southeast Asia and North Africa. Data are deficient on their population, as their commercial landings and human disturbances are unknown, but they are known to be extremely common throughout their range. Over 300 specimens are found in museums.

Local names
In Bengal, South Asia, they are known as koral fish (নানচিল কোরাল). In Indonesia, they were called ikan bulan (moon fish). In Vietnam it is called the cá cháo lớn, "large congee fish".

References

External links
 
 Underwater video of wild Indo-Pacific Tarpon (Oxeye Herring) on YouTube
 Image and info 

Indo-Pacific tarpon
Indo-Pacific tarpon
Taxa named by Pierre Marie Auguste Broussonet